D.Diogo Lopes de Sequeira (1465–1530) was a Portuguese fidalgo, sent to analyze the trade potential in Madagascar and Malacca. He arrived at Malacca on 11 September 1509 and left the next year when he discovered that Sultan Mahmud Shah was planning his assassination. This gave Afonso de Albuquerque the opportunity to embark upon his expedition of conquests.

Sequeira was subsequently made governor of Portuguese India (1518–1522), and in 1520 led a military campaign into the Red Sea which hastened the first legitimate Portuguese embassy to Ethiopia.

See also
 Portuguese Malacca
 Portuguese India

References

Further reading 
 Ronald Bishop Smith, Diogo Lopes de Sequeira, "Diogo Lopes de Sequeira: Elements on His Office of Almotacé Mor", Silvas, 1975 (Inclui o texto de cinco cartas (Fev.1524-Dez.1524) trocadas entre o rei, D.João III e Diogo Lopes de Sequeira, regulador real de pesos, medidas e preços).
 David B. Quinn, Cecil H. Clough, Paul Edward Hedley Hair, "The European outthrust and encounter", p. 97, Liverpool University Press, 1994, 
 Henry Morse Stephens, "Albuquerque", p. 97 – the conquest of Malacca
 James Maxwell Anderson, "The history of Portugal", p. 72, conquest of the city of Malacca, Greenwood Publishing Group, 2000, 
 Sanjay Subrahmanyam, "The Career and Legend of Vasco Da Gama", p. 300, Cambridge University Press, 1997

Viceroys of Portuguese India
Portuguese explorers
Explorers of Asia
1465 births
1530 deaths
Captain-majors of Portuguese Gold Coast
History of Malacca
Maritime history of Portugal
Portuguese admirals
16th century in Ghana
16th-century explorers
15th-century Portuguese people
16th-century Portuguese people